Chris Flannery may refer to:

 Chris Flannery (rugby league) (born 1980), Australian rugby league player
 Christopher Dale Flannery (1948–1985), Australian hitman